Austin Michael Allen (born January 16, 1994) is an American professional baseball catcher in the Miami Marlins organization. He has previously played in MLB for the San Diego Padres and Oakland Athletics.

Career
Allen attended Chaminade College Preparatory School in Creve Coeur, Missouri and played college baseball at the Florida Institute of Technology. In 2015, his junior year, he slashed .421/.473/.728 with 11 home runs and 57 RBIs in 49 games. He was drafted by the San Diego Padres in the fourth round (number 117) of the 2015 Major League Baseball draft.

San Diego Padres
After signing, Allen made his professional debut with the Tri-City Dust Devils that same year and spent the whole season there, batting .240 with two home runs and 34 RBIs in 53 games. He spent 2016 with the Fort Wayne TinCaps where he slashed .320/.364/.425 with seven home runs, 61 RBIs, and a .791 OPS in 109 games, and also played in three games with the San Antonio Missions at the end of the season. He  played 2017 with the Lake Elsinore Storm where he batted .283 with 22 home runs, 81 RBIs, and 31 doubles in 121 games, and he played 2018 with San Antonio, slashing .290/.351/.506 with 22 home runs and 56 RBIs in 119 games.

The Padres added Allen to their 40-man roster after the 2018 season. 

He began 2019 with the El Paso Chihuahuas. On May 11, he was called up to the major leagues. He made his debut that night, drawing a walk in a pinch hit appearance versus Wade Davis.

Oakland Athletics
On December 2, 2019, Allen was traded (along with a player to be named later later revealed to be outfielder Buddy Reed) to the Oakland Athletics in exchange for Jurickson Profar.

Allen hit his first MLB home run against the Texas Rangers on August 5, a two-run shot to give the A's a 5–4 lead they would not relinquish. The A's beat the Rangers 6–4 that night.  Two days later, with two outs in the 13th inning and an 0–2 count against him, Allen drove in a run with a single to tie the game at 2, sparking the A's to a come-from-behind 3–2 walk-off win over the Houston Astros. 

On August 9, 2020, Allen was ejected for the first time in his career for his role in a bench-clearing incident involving Ramon Laureano and Alex Cintron. Despite the ejection, Major League Baseball decided not to suspend Allen for the incident.

The Athletics designated Allen for assignment on May 2, 2022 and outrighted him to the minor leagues.

St. Louis Cardinals
On August 2, 2022, Allen was traded to the St. Louis Cardinals in exchange for Carlos Guarate. He elected free agency on November 10, 2022.

Miami Marlins
On December 5, 2022, Allen signed a minor league contract with the Miami Marlins.

References

External links

1994 births
Living people
Baseball players from St. Louis
Major League Baseball catchers
San Diego Padres players
Oakland Athletics players
Florida Tech Panthers baseball players
Tri-City Dust Devils players
Fort Wayne TinCaps players
Lake Elsinore Storm players
San Antonio Missions players
El Paso Chihuahuas players
Las Vegas Aviators players
Peoria Javelinas players
Chaminade College Preparatory School (Missouri) alumni